Tadashi (Kanji: 正, 禎, 忠, 荘, 匡史 Hiragana: ただし), Japanese masculine name, may refer to :

, the first aikido master to live and teach in the west
, Japanese manga story writer, novelist and screenwriter
, Japanese basketball coach
, Japanese swimmer
, Japanese politician
, Japanese film critic
, a Japanese yakuza boss
, baseball catcher for the Tohoku Rakuten Golden Eagles 
, Japanese cyclist
,artist,painter
, a Japanese plasticist
, Japanese politician
, Japanese boxer
, a Japanese voice actor
, Japanese conductor and flautist
, Japanese politician
 Tadashi Nakamura (disambiguation)
, Japanese speed skater
, Japanese badminton player
, Japanese boxer
, Japanese rower
 Tadashi Sasaki (disambiguation)
 Tadashi Sato, American artist
, Japanese kickboxer
, Japanese photographer
, Japanese communist politician
, Japanese fencer
 Tadashi Shoji, fashion designer 
, a Japanese engineer
, a theatrical director, writer
, Japanese photographer
, Japanese/American baseball player
, Japanese computer engineer
 Tadashi Yamamoto (1936–2012), Japanese internationalist
, Japanese triple jumper
, Japanese American martial artist
, Japanese composer
, Japanese billionaire and richest man in Japan
, Japanese actor

Fictional characters
Tadashi Hamada, a character from Big Hero 6
, a character from anime series S.A: Special A
, a character from Haikyuu with the position of middle blocker from Karasuno High

Japanese masculine given names